Anna Sakse (January 16, 1905 – March 2, 1981) was a Latvian writer and translator. She also wrote under the names Austra Sēja, Smīns, Trīne Grēciņa and Zane Mežadūja.

She was born into a poor farming family in Vidzeme and studied teaching and Baltic philology at the University of Riga but left without completing a degree. Sakse next worked at translation and proofreading for various publications. She married Edgars Abzalons. In 1934, she joined the Communist party, then illegal. At the start of World War II, she left for Russia. During this time, she was editor of the Latvian communist journal Cīņa. She returned to Latvia in 1944 at the same time as the Soviet army entered the country. In 1965, she was awarded the title People's Writer of the Latvian SSR. Some of her works appeared in Russian translations before they were published in Latvian. Her works have been translated in several eastern European and Asian languages.

She died in Riga at the age of 76. Her son Evgenii Andreevich Salhias de Tournemire wrote historical novels.

The first publication was the poem "The Dream of God" in the newspaper Tukums News in 1925. During the Latvian SSR, he propagated communist ideology, glorified collectivization (novel "Against Mountain"), criticized pre -war universities and literary classics (novel "Sparks at night"), condemned Nazism in journalism. Next to ideological work were also written in humorous satirical compositions (collection «Thrown Zars»).  In the final phase of the work, he focused on literary fairy tales (in the collection "Blacksmith Kaspars", "Fairy Tales of Flowers"), adding the literary fairy tale traditions with new features and images. Several works have been translated into Russian, German, Estonian, Uzbek.

Legacy 
Named streets in Riga, Babite, Marupe and Lejasciems, Gulbene county. In 2022, the Gulbene Municipality began to create Anna Saks' Ceriņš Park in Lejasciems to honor the politician and literary.

Selected works 
 Dzirksteles naktī (Sparks in the Night), novel (2 volumes) (1951-1957)
 Pasakas par ziediem (Tales about flowers), fairy tales (1966)

References 

1905 births
1981 deaths
People from Gulbene Municipality
People from the Governorate of Livonia
Third convocation members of the Supreme Soviet of the Soviet Union
Fourth convocation members of the Supreme Soviet of the Soviet Union
Latvian novelists
Latvian women writers
Pseudonymous women writers
20th-century Latvian women writers
20th-century Latvian writers
People's Writers of the Latvian SSR
Stalin Prize winners
20th-century pseudonymous writers
Soviet writers